Andrey Nikolayevich Shkurin (born 3 March 1972 in Moscow) is a former Kazakhstani Russian-born football player.

Honours
Tobol
Kazakhstan Premier League runner-up: 2003, 2005
Kazakhstan Premier League  bronze: 2002, 2004
Kazakhstan Cup runner-up: 2003

Aktobe
Kazakhstan Premier League champion: 2007
Kazakhstan Premier League runner-up: 2006

References

External links

1972 births
Footballers from Moscow
Living people
Soviet footballers
Kazakhstani footballers
FC Dynamo Moscow players
FC Chernomorets Novorossiysk players
Russian Premier League players
Kazakhstani expatriate footballers
Expatriate footballers in Russia
FC Shinnik Yaroslavl players
FC Kuban Krasnodar players
FC Tobol players
Kazakhstan international footballers
FC Aktobe players
Kazakhstan Premier League players
Association football defenders
FC FShM Torpedo Moscow players
FC Nosta Novotroitsk players